Dov Moran (born 1955) is an Israeli entrepreneur, inventor and investor, best known as the inventor of the USB memory stick, and one of the most prominent Israeli hi-tech leaders.

Biography
Dov Moran was born in Ramat Gan, Israel, to a family of Holocaust survivors who immigrated to Israel from Poland. His father, Baruch Mintz, came from a well-off family from Krosno. The only Mintz family members who managed to survive the Holocaust were Dov's father and grandfather who began a new life in Israel. Dov's mother, Bina Gever, immigrated to Israel with her family who escaped Blonie.

His interest in technology was obvious from his childhood days. At the age of ten he used to order electronic components and digital watch parts from MAD magazine, with the intention to create new improved devices, however, as he later testified, no significant results were achieved. In the following years, his curiosity and talent started to lead to breakthroughs. At the age of 16 he was sent to an annual course in computers held in Tel-Aviv University. Back then, in order to write a program you needed to mark cards dedicated to that with a pen. After three months of struggling to deal with that system, he wrote his first program. His programming skills improved while obtaining a Bachelor of Science degree in Electrical Engineering (with honors) at the Technion – Israel Institute of Technology in Haifa. That was when he decided "to start his own company”.

Moran served in the Israeli Navy for seven years and was commander of its advanced microprocessor department. Prior to becoming an entrepreneur, Moran was an independent consultant in the computer industry.

Business career
Moran formed M-Systems in 1989, a pioneer in the flash data storage market. The company invented the USB flash drive (DiskOnKey), the FlashDisk (DiskOnChip) as well as several other innovative flash data storage devices. Under Moran's leadership, M-Systems grew to $US1 billion revenue within 18 years, and at the end of 2006 it was acquired by SanDisk Corp (NSDQ: SNDK) for $US1.6 billion.

After the sale of M-Systems, Moran founded Modu, a company with a new modular phone concept, which eventually sold its patents to Google in 2011. These patents are the basis for Google's modular phone project, called Project Ara. After Modu was sold to Google, more than 30 hi-tech innovative companies were founded by Modu's ex-employees.

During his time at Modu, Moran was also the chairman of Tower Semiconductor, a developer and manufacturer of semiconductors and integrated circuits. During his tenure, he turned the struggling company around towards profitability. Moran was also chairman of Biomas, a developer of pharmaceuticals.

Inventions 
Moran has been involved with a number of inventions, mostly in the field of infrastructure technologies. He says he has filed over 40 patents and patent applications.  Inventions he's been involved with include:
USB flash drive  (DiskOnKey)- small Flash memory device
 the FlashDisk (DiskOnChip) 
 Modu 's revolutionary modular phone -  the basis for Google's modular phone Project Ara
 Lightest mobile phone - Modu (weighs 40.1 g) world held the record for the world's lightest mobile phone.
 Smartype - revolutionary smart keyboard 
 Comigo's smart interactive TV system - patented hardware and software

Investments 
In January 2015, after several years of angel investing, Moran founded Grove ventures, a $US100 million venture capital fund primarily investing in early-stage startups with cutting-edge technologies such as semi-conductor, sensors, artificial intelligence and Digital Health. In October 2017, Grove Ventures raised $110 million in commitments. In February 2020, Grove Ventures closed a second fund with $120 million in commitments.

Companies he invested in or launched include:
 Consumer Physics, A thumb-sized spectrometer which acts as "digital materials analyzer", enabling a user to identify products' source, freshness, ingredients, the mix of materials and nutrition value.
 Sensible Medical Innovation Ltd., Absolute lung fluid monitor based on sensing and monitoring technology providing data for the management and treatment of several chronic medical conditions.
 GlucoMe, develops a blood glucose meter that provides an interface to the cloud through a phone or tablet to allow data gathering and analysis, alerts and patient monitoring.
 Geneformics, focused on computing for genomics (DNA sequencing). Geneformics aims to provide savings in the storage, communications and cloud processing of DNA sequencing.
 RapidAPI, a company that developed application programming interfaces (APIs).
In addition to several investments made by the fund.

Community activism and public sector career
Moran perceives education as the grounding for innovation. As such, he mentors Israeli entrepreneurs, assisting in converting research and innovation to business. He lectures extensively in universities and schools and sits on the advisory board of Tel Aviv University Momentum Fund. In addition, Moran has invested in Learni, which brings technology into everyday learning system, and enables rich digital textbooks, in a managed interactive classroom environment.

He is an active member of the Korean Israel Business Forum, having spoken at conferences, and in 2014, was asked by the Korean government to spearhead a project aimed at growing innovation in Seoul, the capital of Korea.

His book, 100 Doors - An introduction to entrepreneurship, was published by Yedioth Book in September 2016.

Awards and recognition

 In 2003 he was named Entrepreneur of the Year by Ernst & Young, and "CEO of the Year" by the IMC.
 In 2007, the IVA (Israel Venture Association) awarded Dov Moran the Israeli Hi-Tech award as Entrepreneur of the Year.
 In 2012 Moran was awarded the prestigious Edward Rheine Award for inventing the USB flash drive.
 In 2013, he was named "Doctor Honoris Causa" from Moscow State Technical University of Radio Engineering, Electronics and Automation.
 In the same year he had the title Honoris Causa conferred on him by Israel's Academic Center of Law and Science, in the company of other notable leaders such as former Prime Minister Ehud Barak, Minister of Education Rabbi Shai Piron and Canada's Former Minister of Justice and State Attorney, Prof. Irwin Cotler.
 Again in 2013, he was presented with a lifetime achievement Award by Geektime. Its "Geek Awards" are an annual competition to recognize and celebrate the most compelling startups, entrepreneurs and investors of the year in Israel.
 In 2015, he received the Johnson Information Storage Systems Award for pioneering contributions to storage systems based on flash memory.
 In 2016, Moran was awarded honorary doctorate at Technion-Israel Institute of Technology.
 In February 2018 Moran received, among others, the Netexplo Talent of the Year award in a ceremony held by UNESCO in Paris.

Personal life 
Moran is married and has four children. His wife became religious 20 years after they got married.

See also
 Pua Khein-Seng
 Netac Technology

References

External links
Dov Moran at Grove Ventures,

1956 births
Living people
Israeli businesspeople
Israeli engineers
Israeli inventors
Israeli Jews
Technion – Israel Institute of Technology alumni
Israeli investors
Israeli Venture capitalists